Michael Paul Livingston (born November 14, 1945) is a former American football player, a quarterback in the American Football League (AFL) and National Football League (NFL) for twelve seasons with the Kansas City Chiefs.

Early years
Born and raised in Dallas, Texas, Livingston graduated from its South Oak Cliff High School in 1964, and played college football at Southern Methodist University in Dallas under head coach Hayden Fry, where he broke most of Don Meredith's passing records.

Playing career
Livingston was a second round selection in the 1968 NFL/AFL draft, 48th overall, by the Kansas City Chiefs of the AFL. He was the fourth quarterback taken, after Greg Landry, Eldridge Dickey, and Heisman Trophy winner Gary Beban.

During the Chiefs' world championship season in 1969, starter Len Dawson and backup Jacky Lee went down with injuries, and Livingston started six games, threw for 1,123 yards, was 84 of 161, with four touchdowns, and the Chiefs won all six. Dawson returned in November, and they went on to win Super Bowl IV in New Orleans.

Livingston made 75 starts for the Chiefs, splitting time in the mid-1970s with Dawson, who retired in May 1976. The Chiefs' only head coach, Hank Stram, was fired after a 5–9 record in 1974. Under three head coaches, Livingston was the starter from 1975 until 1979, when he was pulled by Marv Levy in favor of rookie Steve Fuller, but made several starts.

On the roster of the Minnesota Vikings in 1980, Livingston saw no regular season action behind Tommy Kramer and Steve Dils. At age 37, he played in the United States Football League (USFL) in 1983 with the Oakland Invaders as a backup to Fred Besana under head coach John Ralston, then was waived in February 1984.

See also
Other American Football League players

References

External links
 
 Sports Reference – collegiate statistics – Mike Livingston

1945 births
Living people
American football quarterbacks
Kansas City Chiefs players
Oakland Invaders players
SMU Mustangs football players
American Football League All-Star players
People from Dallas
Players of American football from Texas
American Football League players